Zarrineh Rud Rural District is in Bizineh Rud District of Khodabandeh County, Zanjan province, Iran. At the National Census of 2006, its population was 16,067 in 3,258 households. There were 15,178 inhabitants in 3,946 households at the following census of 2011. At the most recent census of 2016, the population of the rural district was 13,670 in 3,988 households. The largest of its 30 villages was Hesamabad, with 1,580 people.

References 

Khodabandeh County

Rural Districts of Zanjan Province

Populated places in Zanjan Province

Populated places in Khodabandeh County